Selegas, Sèligas in sardinian language, is a comune (municipality) in the Province of South Sardinia in the Italian region Sardinia, located about  north of Cagliari.

Selegas borders the following municipalities: Gesico, Guamaggiore, Ortacesus, Senorbì, Suelli.

Demographic evolution

References 

Cities and towns in Sardinia